Eva Gronbach (born 1971, in Cologne, West Germany) is a German fashion designer.

Literature 
Patricia Brattig (Hrsg.): Ausstellungskatalog, In: femme fashion 1780–2004: die Modellierung des Weiblichen in der Mode, Arnoldsche Verlagsanstalt, Stuttgart 2003, 
Eva Gronbach und Susanne Anna: Generation Mode (the Fashion Generation), Hatje Cantz Verlag, Ostfildern 2005,

References

External links

 Eva Gronbach Homepage
 Goethe Institute: [Versatile and Political – Eva Gronbach and her Collections]
 Zeche Zollverein 
 Eva Gronbach as the fashion design referee at the Berliner Akademie der Künste. Fashion@society - fashion design, youth culture, social identity. Organized by Bundeszentrale für politische  Bildung 

1971 births
German fashion designers
German women fashion designers
Living people
Businesspeople from Cologne
Waldorf school alumni